Mohannad Mahadin (born 7 April 1973 in Amman) is a former Jordanian footballer, who was a defender  for Al-Faisaly (Amman) and the Jordan national football team until he became managing director of his national team (2009-2010) when he was succeeded by Osama Talal. He is currently a board member of the Jordan Football Association, working as director of marketing and communications.
 
An international friendly match between Jordan and Iraq on 8 June 2007 in Amman was the mark of his retirement in football.

Honors and Participation in International Tournaments

In Pan Arab Games 
1997 Pan Arab Games
1999 Pan Arab Games

In Arab Nations Cup 
1998 Arab Nations Cup
2002 Arab Nations Cup

In WAFF Championships 
2000 WAFF Championship
2002 WAFF Championship

References
 Vieira Leads the Iraqi Team in an International Friendly Match Against Jordan Marking the Retirement of Mohannad Mahadeen

External links 
 
 
 

1973 births
Living people
Jordanian footballers
Jordan international footballers
Association football defenders
Al-Muharraq SC players
Al-Faisaly SC players
Jordanian Pro League players
Bahraini Premier League players
Jordanian expatriate footballers
Jordanian expatriate sportspeople in Bahrain
Expatriate footballers in Bahrain
Sportspeople from Amman